Edinburgh Airport  is an airport located in the Ingliston area of Edinburgh, Scotland. It was the busiest airport in Scotland in 2019, handling over 14.7 million passengers. It was also the sixth-busiest airport in the United Kingdom by total passengers in 2019. It is owned and operated by Global Infrastructure Partners, who are also a minority shareholder of Gatwick Airport. The airport has one runway and one passenger terminal and employs about 2,500 people.

History

Early years

Turnhouse Aerodrome was the most northerly British air defence base in World War I used by the Royal Flying Corps. The small base opened in 1916 and it was used to house the 603 (City of Edinburgh) Squadron from 1925, which consisted of DH 9As, Westland Wapitis, Hawker Harts, and Hawker Hind light bombers. All the aircraft used a grass airstrip.

In 1918 the Royal Air Force was formed and the airfield was named RAF Turnhouse and ownership was transferred to the Air Ministry.

During the Battle of Britain, 3, 65, and 141 Squadrons were present at the airbase.

Post Second World War
When the war ended the airfield remained under military control. It was officially opened for commercial traffic on 19 May 1947. The first commercial flight to use the airport was a British European Airways service from London (Northolt) to Shetland, with Edinburgh and Aberdeen being intermediate stopping points. The aircraft was an 18-seat Douglas C47. 

In 1952 the runway was extended to 6000 ft to handle the Vampire FB5s operated by the resident 603 Squadron, and an aircraft arresting barrier net was installed to protect traffic on the adjacent A9 road. The net remained in place until the early 1970s and was used to stop one of the Ferranti Flying Unit Buccaneers which had overrun the runway. A further use was in 1970 when a Meteor TT20, operated by the RN Fleet Requirement Unit, overran the runway and ended up in the net. In 1956 a new passenger terminal was built to provide an improved commercial service; five years later it was extended. After the disbandment of the 603 Squadron in March 1957, the Air Ministry transferred ownership to the Ministry of Aviation in 1960 to offer improved commercial service to the airport. Flying was temporarily diverted to East Fortune, which had its runway extended to accommodate the airliners of the period.

BAA ownership 1971 to 2012

The British Airports Authority (BAA) took over ownership of the airport on 1 April 1971 at a time when the original terminal building was running at about eight times its design capacity. Immediate improvements to the terminal were cosmetic, such as extra seating and TV monitors for flight information, and it took two years for plans to be proposed for a completely new terminal and runway redesign. Public consultation on planning started in November 1971 and ended in February 1972. The initial stages of the redevelopment began in June 1973; they included a diversion of the River Almond. Work on the new terminal building, designed by Sir Robert Matthew, started in March 1975, and the building was officially opened by Queen Elizabeth II on 27 May 1977, opening to the public two days later.

Although the original main runway 13/31 (which is now 12/30) served the airport well, its alignment (NW-SE) had the disadvantage of suffering from severe crosswinds, and the other two minor runways were very short and could not be readily extended, so movements were transferred to a new runway (07/25, which has since become 06/24) in an addition completely outside the original airfield boundary. A new terminal was built alongside the runway to cater for the additional traffic. The old terminal and hangars were converted into a cargo centre.

International service from Edinburgh began in 1962 with direct service to Dublin, but for many years international flights were charter and private only. This started to change during the late 1970s, with direct services to continental Europe (Amsterdam, 1975). By the mid-1980s direct routes included Paris, Düsseldorf, Brussels, Frankfurt and Copenhagen, but direct transatlantic flights were not yet possible as Glasgow-Prestwick was the only "designated gateway" in Scotland under the US-UK Bermuda II Agreement. By the time BAA had been privatised in 1987, Edinburgh Airport handled over 1.8 million passengers each year; compared to the 681,000 passengers handled in 1971 when BAA first took control of the airport.

RAF Turnhouse was operational near the passenger terminal of the airport for all of the post-war period but was finally closed in 1997.

Since the original terminal upgrade in 1977, there have been major reconstructions, including extensions of the two passenger terminal aprons and a major expansion of car parking facilities, including a multi-storey car park in 2004. In 2005, a new  air traffic control tower was completed for £10m. An extension to the terminal called the South East Pier opened in September 2006. This extension initially added six gates on a new pier to the southeast of the original building. A further four gates were added to the South East Pier at the end of 2008.

On 19 October 2011, BAA Limited announced its intention to sell the airport, following a decision by the UK's Competition Commission requiring BAA to sell either Glasgow Airport or Edinburgh Airport.

Expansion
In 2013, a further extension to the passenger terminal was announced, taking the terminal building up to the Edinburgh Airport tram stop. The Edinburgh Trams opening in May 2014 created the first rail connection to Edinburgh Airport. Whilst the number of passengers has increased, the number of flights decreased in 2014 due to planes operating at a higher capacity. Passenger traffic at Edinburgh Airport reached a record level in 2015 with over 11.1 million passengers and over 109,000 aircraft movements. The terminal building is currently being expanded with an investment of £40m. A new £25m expansion project involving the construction of a new 6,000 m² building, housing a security hall and retail areas, is also currently underway at the airport. On 23 February 2016, Ryanair announced a growth of 20% in passenger numbers, bringing the airline's annual passenger capacity at Edinburgh Airport to 2.5 million. This was coupled with the news of six new services to Ryanair's winter schedule from Edinburgh and more services on its popular European destinations. In February 2016, consultancy firm Biggar Economics announced that Edinburgh Airport contributes almost £1 billion annually to the Scottish economy. As part of the expansion works, Runway 12/30 was officially withdrawn from use on 29 March 2018.

Airlines and destinations

The following airlines operate regularly scheduled flights to and from Edinburgh:

Statistics

Passenger Numbers

Busiest routes

Access and ground transport

Bus
Several operators provide bus services from the airport:

 Lothian Buses provides public transportation to the airport and Edinburgh.
McGill's Scotland East provides public transportation to the airport and West Lothian with one service.
Stagecoach East Scotland provides public transportation to the airport and Fife with one service.
Xplore Dundee provides public transport to the airport from Dundee.
Citylink provides public transportation to the airport from Glasgow and Stirling.

Road
The airport lies on the A8 road, and can be reached by the M8 motorway and the M9 motorway. The airport is also within access from the M90 motorway via the Queensferry Crossing.

Train
The airport has no dedicated railway station. However, it is served by the nearby Edinburgh Gateway station, which serves as an interchange with Edinburgh Trams services to the airport. The tram line also connects the airport to the nearby Edinburgh Park railway station.

A more expensive Edinburgh Airport Rail Link project to provide a direct heavy rail link was cancelled in 2007 due to increasing costs.

Tram
The airport is served by Edinburgh Trams, a light rail link. The system runs from the airport and travels across the western suburbs of Edinburgh, terminating in the city centre.

Accidents and incidents
On 20 July 1970, a Hawker Siddeley HS-125-3B (G-AXPS) operated by the Imperial Tobacco Company crashed on takeoff from Turnhouse on an empty positioning flight to Newcastle. The aircraft was a total loss and whilst the pilot was uninjured, the copilot was declared dead on arrival at the hospital. The probable cause of the crash was thought to be the application of an incorrect rudder following a simulated engine failure on take-off. The reason for this application of an incorrect rudder has not been determined.

A De Havilland Moth Minor (G-AFOZ) crashed at Turnhouse during a low-level display on 3 May 1975. One of the two occupants died in the hospital the following day.

On 27 February 2001, a Loganair Shorts 360 (G-BNMT) operating a Royal Mail flight to Belfast, crashed into the Firth of Forth shortly after taking off from Edinburgh at 1730 GMT. Both crew members were killed, but there were no passengers on board. A fatal accident inquiry later blamed a buildup of slush in the aircraft's engines before the crash. A protective covering had not been fitted to the engine intakes while the aircraft was parked at Edinburgh for several hours in heavy snow.

Notes

References

External links 

 
 EDINBURGH AIRPORT, TURNHOUSE (1971) (archive film from the National Library of Scotland: SCOTTISH SCREEN ARCHIVE)
 
 

 
Airports in Scotland
Heathrow Airport Holdings
Transport in Edinburgh
Airports established in 1916
Edinburgh Trams stops
1916 establishments in Scotland